Dorothy Akinyi Ooko is a Kenyan activist and technology professional.

Born in Mater Hospital, Nairobi, She attended Fort Hall Road Primary School in her home city and then Pangani Girls High School for her "O" Level and completed her "A" Level at Alliance Girls' High School. After her "A" levels she went to Université de Haute Bretagne in France, where she studied Lettres Modernes before switching to English Language. She returned to Kenya and pursued her Bachelor of Education (French and English in Literature) from 1985-1988. She taught at Mukumu Girls' for a short stint and then received a scholarship to do a Masters in French from Kenya University. She also has a Masters in International Business Administration from United States International University (USIU).

Ooko is the Communications Manager, East and Francophone Africa for Google based in Nairobi. Prior to that, she was working for Nokia in Nairobi as well.

Achievements
Ooko spearheaded the lobbying for the removal of Value Added Tax (VAT) on mobile phones in Kenya. As part of the Nokia East and Southern Africa team, she worked with the LG team, Safaricom and mobile handset distributors.

References

Year of birth missing (living people)
Living people
Kenyan Luo people
21st-century Kenyan businesswomen
21st-century Kenyan businesspeople
People from Nairobi